The Europe Sails Hyper is an Austrian high-wing, single-place, hang glider that was designed and produced by Europe Sails.

Design and development

The aircraft is made from aluminum tubing, with the wing covered in Dacron sailcloth. Its  span wing has a nose angle of 132° and an aspect ratio of 7.5:1. The design sold for €3963 in 2003.

Specifications (Hyper)

References

Hang gliders